In The Plex: How Google Thinks, Works, and Shapes Our Lives is a 2011 book by American technology reporter Steven Levy. It covers the growth of the Google company from its academic project origins at Stanford to the company that is rolling in billions of long-tail advertising dollars, forms the central exchange for information on the internet, having by then already grown to 24,000 employees.

Synopsis

Contents
The World According to Google: Biography of a Search Engine
Googlenomics: Cracking the Code on Internet Profits
Don't be Evil: How Google Built Its Culture
Google's Cloud: Building Data Centers That Hold Everything Ever Written
Outside the Box: The Google Phone Company and the Google TV Company
GuGe: Google's Moral Dilemma in China
Google.gov: is What's Good for Google, Good for Government --- or the Public?
Epilogue: Chasing Taillights

Reception
Siva Vaidhyanathan writes in The Washington Post: "Others have tried to make Google’s problem-solving processes intelligible and gripping. Levy has outdone them all. He has produced the most interesting book ever written about Google. He makes the biggest intellectual challenges of computer science seem endlessly fun and fascinating."  Kirkus Reviews sums up the book as: "Outstanding reportage delivered in the upbeat, informative fashion for which Levy is well known."

References

External links
Interview with Levy on In the Plex, April 6, 2011,  C-SPAN

2011 non-fiction books
Books about Google
Books by Steven Levy
Simon & Schuster books